William Farr was an epidemiologist and medical statistician.

 William Farr is also the name of:

William C. Farr, U.S. politician
William Farr School, Lincolnshire, England